The Chinese Ambassador to Madagascar is the official representative of the People's Republic of China to the Republic of Madagascar.

List of representatives

References 

 
Madagascar
China